The First Snow of Winter is a British animated television film produced by Hibbert Ralph Entertainment and Link Entertainment and first aired on the BBC on 25 December 1998. The film features the voices of Miriam Margolyes, Dermot Morgan, Sorcha Cusack, Kate Sachs and Neil McCaul. It was released on video in 1998 by BBC Worldwide and 1999 by Columbia TriStar Home Video in the United States.

It was dedicated to Dermot Morgan, who died before the film was released.

Plot
The story takes place in Ireland. Winter is approaching and ducks are starting their migration south. A young and daring white diapered duck named Sean McDuck decides to slide down a hill and cross over to the other side of a stream, despite warnings from his young puffin friend, Puffy. When Sean reaches the other side, Puffy tells him about a red fox, which Sean narrowly escapes. When Sean and his family migrate, he gets lost trying to chase some seagulls. Later, he is hit by a Boeing B-9 jet aircraft and becomes stranded with a broken wing. His family thinks he has been killed by the fox when Sean's mother sees her with her kits playing with white feathers.

A kindly tympanic water vole named Voley is preparing for his winter hibernation but stops to help Sean get ready for the cold weather ahead. Voley also teaches Sean to play a blade of grass as a musical instrument and even does an Irish stepdance with Sean and a chorus line of sheep. Despite Sean's wishes for him to remain, Voley soon heads off to start his hibernation. After struggling through the first night of a snowy blizzard warning and having to take shelter in a wellington boot, Sean discovers that Puffy was also left behind.

For the rest of the winter the two friends keep each other company. When spring comes, Sean and Puffy eagerly look for their families. The two friends are then cornered by the fox and eventually end up on a ship, but are rescued by Voley while Sean manages to drive away the fox, regaining his ability to fly in the process. Shortly afterward, Sean and Puffy are happily reunited with their families as Sean stepdances with Voley.

Voice cast
Voley – Dermot Morgan (UK Version)
Voley – Tim Curry (US Version) 
Mother Duck – Sorcha Cusack (UK Version) 
Mother Duck – Carol Kane (US Version) 
Sean McDuck – Miriam Margolyes (UK Version) 
Sean McDuck – Ashley Johnson (US Version) 
Father Duck – Neil McCaul (UK and US Version) 
Puffy – Kate Sachs (UK and US Version)

References

External links

1998 television films
1998 television specials
BBC children's television shows
1990s animated television specials
1990s animated short films
British television specials
British animated short films
American children's films
Films about ducks
Christmas television specials
Animated films about foxes
Animated television films
1998 animated films
1998 films
1990s American animated films
American animated featurettes
American animated short films
Films set in Ireland
1990s British films